Jumbo Kingdom consisted of the Jumbo Floating Restaurant and the adjacent Tai Pak Floating Restaurant, which were tourist attractions in Aberdeen South Typhoon Shelter, within Hong Kong's Aberdeen Harbour. During its 44 years of operation, over thirty million visitors visited Jumbo Kingdom, including Queen Elizabeth II, Jimmy Carter, Tom Cruise, Chow Yun Fat, and Gong Li. A subsidiary, Jumbo Kingdom Manila, operated in Manila Bay, Philippines, but closed after eight years. Jumbo Kingdom was part of Melco International Development Limited, a company listed on the Hong Kong Stock Exchange. It suspended operations in 2020 amidst the COVID-19 outbreak.

On 14 June 2022, the Jumbo Floating Restaurant was towed out of Hong Kong to Cambodia to await a new operator. While transiting in the South China Sea, it experienced bad weather and capsized near the Paracel Islands on 19 June 2022. Its operator has denied describing it as sunk.

Origin 
According to a senior editor from the Hong Kong Chronicles Institute, predecessors to floating restaurants were once fishermen's barges from the Guangzhou and Pearl River areas. They had stages built into them for people to host banquets, sing and dance. During the 1920s and 30s, Hong Kong fishermen from Aberdeen began operating similar barges. They originally offered food and banquet services to the fishing community only but gradually began to cater to the rest of the public.

History
The Jumbo Kingdom was established in October 1976 by Stanley Ho after more than HK$30 million were spent to design and build it. It was originally decorated in the style of an ancient Chinese imperial palace. Ho later purchased Tai Pak in 1980 and Sea Palace in 1982, operating all three former competitors under Jumbo Kingdom.

Tai Pak Floating Restaurant 

The Tai Pak Floating Restaurant was established in 1952, when Wong Lo-kat (along with three other investors) purchased a boat and transformed it into a floating restaurant spanning  in length. Six years later, Tai Pak was extended to accommodate 800 guests. Due to Tai Pak's smaller size compared to Jumbo, it was granted permission as a laid-up vessel in 2022 during negotiation with a buyer. The transfer of ownership was completed in August. Its new operator intends to renovate the restaurant to serve an Asian-Western fusion cuisine, promote Hong Kong tourism as well as local brands. A second Tai Pak floating restaurant operated from Castle Peak, now Tuen Mun, and was sold off and relocated to Guangxi in the 1980s.

Jumbo Floating Restaurant 
Wong ordered the construction of a second restaurant, the Jumbo Floating Restaurant, by the Kowloon Chung Hwa shipyard, at the price of HK$14 million. It was similarly decorated in the style of an imperial palace. On 30 October 1971, a four-alarm fire occurred at the restaurant before its opening which left 34 dead and 42 injured. It had to be rebuilt after new owners Stanley Ho and Cheng Yu-ting bought the title to the remaining assets in July 1972. After total expenditure of HK$30 million, the restaurant began operation in 1976.

During the 1980s and 90s, a period of great prosperity in Hong Kong, the restaurant was often one of the destinations for investors and foreign tourists. Every night, large numbers of diners feasted on such cuisine as crabs, lobster, and roasted suckling pig. Even though most locals knew that the best food was not served there, its exotic oriental atmosphere helped it become a symbol that is somewhat but not entirely unique about Hong Kong.

In the finale of the 1996 comedy film The God of Cookery, Stephen Chow judged a cooking competition that caught the attention of audiences all over China; it was held inside the restaurant.

The restaurant intermittently suspended operations after the 1997 Asian financial crisis. It went through a multimillion-dollar renovation in 2003, emerging as a structure  in length,  in area and boasting a seating capacity of 2,300 diners, along with a dragon throne, aquarium and a six-storey pagoda.

On 1 March 2020, the restaurant announced it would be closed until further notice and laid off all staff due to the COVID-19 pandemic.

According to the November 2020 Hong Kong policy address, the operator of the Jumbo Floating Restaurant agreed to donate the vessel to Ocean Park Hong Kong as part of the Invigorating Island South project. On 12 March 2021, it was reported that the plan to reactivate the restaurant had been shelved. Other proposals to preserve it, such as relocating onto land or converting to a Bruce Lee museum, were all met with objections. The Hong Kong Jockey Club did not comment following a suggestion for it to take in the vessel. The Antiquities Advisory Board stated that because ships are not covered under the Antiquities and Monuments Ordinance, they cannot be evaluated for conservation.

2022 capsizing 

According to the parent company Aberdeen Restaurant Enterprises (ARE), as of 2022 the Jumbo Floating Restaurant had been unprofitable since 2013 and had accumulated losses exceeding HK$100 million. On 30 May 2022, the company announced that the restaurant would leave Hong Kong in June 2022. ARE's offers to donate it were not successful as all interested parties cited high operating costs, which can run in the millions of Hong Kong dollars annually. Because its operating licence with the Marine Department was due to expire, and there was no berth available, ARE decided to have the restaurant towed out of Hong Kong and wait for better prospects. At roughly 11pm on 31 May, the kitchen boat of the restaurant began listing following a hull breach. It happened as preparations were being made to tow the restaurant. It was eventually towed out of Hong Kong on 14 June, though the kitchen boat and Tai Pak were left behind. The destination was Cambodia according to the Marine Department, but this has not been confirmed by ARE. The company said that before the tow, the restaurant was inspected, hoardings were installed, and all relevant approvals were obtained.

On 18 June 2022, while being towed in the South China Sea, the restaurant experienced bad weather and began listing. Amidst speculations that the boat had sunk, the Hong Kong Marine Department requested a report from ARE, which issued a statement saying that the tug and restaurant were still in the waters and that it had always used the term "capsized", not "sunk". In August, the Maritime Safety Administration of Hainan said the boat had keeled over and was trapped on a reef near Sansha. In October, DimSum Daily reported that there had been an operation to salvage Jumbo's wreckage.

Tourism lawmaker Perry Yiu Pak-leung said the loss was of the city's heritage, adding that the "government, conservationists, historians and the commercial sector should be working together to protect" historic sites but everyone had "stalled too long." Other lawmakers in Hong Kong requested an investigation of the South Korean tug boat company to determine whether there was human error or malpractice involved. The company, which employed a South Korean crew, has denied allegations of foul play. In 2021, the same tugboat, Jaewon 9, was involved in an incident where the vessel that it was towing sank after the towing line broke. Commentators from the fishing and shipbuilding industries said that a safer method would have been using a semi-submersible ship, like the ones that transported Sea Palace to Manila Bay and Tsingtao. The market availability of such vessels is low, however, and the price for their service can be prohibitive. The chairman of Yun Lee Marine Group said he does not know of any owners of semi-submersibles in Hong Kong. Some pointed out that the restaurant is top heavy due to its multi-story superstructure and that towing it outside to the high seas should have called for extra precautions. Others argued that as long as the boat itself can be proven as seaworthy, the specific method of transport is secondary.

A digital, three-dimensional model of Jumbo has been created by a student, Shiu Ka-heng. He fed photographs of the boat's exterior into a computer program that transformed them into models viewable using virtual reality goggles. Shiu hopes to archive pieces of Hong Kong history, such as the State Theatre that is undergoing revamp, and said that anyone can use his online platform to turn images into virtual models.

In November 2022, King Field Shipyard sued the owners of Tai Pak and Jumbo for the return of the three restaurant barges and unpaid handling fees totaling HK$4.8M.

Sea Palace 
In 1991, Sea Palace was renamed "Jumbo Palace". Shortly after the 1997 Asian financial crisis, it was sold for US$800 million and towed to Manila Bay. Rebranded as "Jumbo Kingdom Manila", much of the original ancient Chinese imperial palace style renovation was retained. The highest level was turned into a large dance floor, and a resident band was hired. It closed down in 2008. The boat was donated to the government of Shantung province in 2011 and towed to Tsingtao as part of an upcoming seaside park. It was intended to undergo reconstruction, including an underwater structure that prevents up and down movements in water, and reopen in May 2014 catering primarily to wedding events, but renovations were still incomplete as of 2021. Local residents have attempted to tour the closed boat on their own, despite the rusting hull and a safety perimeter put in place to deter visitors. A member of the city's SASAC said that because of how complex the structure of the boat is and the absence of some supporting facilities, the operator has not been able to reopen the restaurant.

Attractions

 Roof Deck: An alfresco banquet hall located on the top deck of Jumbo serving fine Western food.
 Dragon Court: Dragon Court was a fine dining Chinese restaurant located on the first deck of Jumbo. The interior design of the restaurant was a mixture of Ming Dynasty and contemporary Chinese.
 Shum Wan Pier Garden: Outdoor venue for wedding and cocktail receptions.

A staff canteen was located on the fourth floor of Jumbo Kingdom, named So-Kee Coffee Shop, that served Hong Kong cuisine including noodles and street food. The boat also housed a cooking academy and facilities for conference and banqueting.

In popular culture
 The Jumbo Floating Restaurant appeared in the James Bond film The Man with the Golden Gun (1974), Jackie Chan's The Protector (1985), in Giant Robo: The Day the Earth Stood Still (1992), The God of Cookery (1996), Godzilla vs Destroyah, Infernal Affairs II, Emanuelle Around the World (1977) and Contagion (2011).
 The Tai Pak Floating Restaurant was featured in Love Is a Many-Splendored Thing (1955), Enter the Dragon (1973), The God of Cookery (1996), and Contagion (2011).
 Jumbo Kingdom also appeared in the video games Fatal Fury 2, Fatal Fury Special and Sleeping Dogs.
 It appeared in various episodes of The Amazing Race and its international spinoffs.
 The American miniseries Noble House depicts the compound being destroyed by a fire.

Access
The Jumbo Kingdom was formerly accessed via a free shuttle boat from Aberdeen Promenade or from Sham Wan pier.

Gallery

See also
Floating restaurant
List of restaurants in China

References

External links

1976 establishments in Hong Kong
Aberdeen, Hong Kong
Cantonese restaurants
Chinese restaurants in Hong Kong
Defunct Chinese restaurants
Defunct restaurants
Defunct seafood restaurants
Floating restaurants
Landmarks in Hong Kong
Maritime incidents in 2022
Restaurants established in 1976
Restaurants disestablished in 2022
Restaurants in Hong Kong
Seafood restaurants
Tourist attractions in Hong Kong
2022 disestablishments in Hong Kong